Marcelo Rozo (born 6 September 1989) is a Colombian professional golfer who plays on Korn Ferry Tour.

Professional career
Rozo turned professional in 2012. He became a full-time member of PGA Tour Latinoamérica in 2013 and won his first title on the tour at the Visa Open de Argentina on 8 December 2013. Having shot a course record 64 in the second round, Rozo eventually won the tournament by two strokes in a field including two-time major winner Ángel Cabrera.

Rozo earned his second win on PGA Tour Latinoamérica at the TransAmerican Power Products CRV Open at Guadalajara on 23 March 2014, eagling the second playoff hole in a seven-way playoff. This win moved Rozo to a career high of 414th in the Official World Golf Ranking and into the top 500 for the first time in his career. Later he finished second at the Ecuador Open and Colombian Classic, third at the Abierto del Centro, fourth at the Argentine Open, fifth at the Roberto De Vicenzo Invitational Copa NEC, sixth at the Lexus Panama Classic and ninth at the Mexico Open. With US$89,117 in earnings, he ended second at the PGA Tour Latinoamérica Order of Merit.

In 2015, Rozo won the gold medal at the Pan American Games.  However, he missed the cut at each of his seven appearances at the Web.com Tour. Therefore he switched to the PGA Tour Latinoamérica mid-season, collecting a 6th finish at the Guatemala Open and a 7th at the Colombian Classic. In 2018, Rozo won the gold medal at the Central American and Caribbean Games.

Professional wins (6)

PGA Tour Latinoamérica wins (3)

PGA Tour Latinoamerica Developmental Series wins (2)

Other wins (1)

Playoff record
Korn Ferry Tour playoff record (0–1)

Team appearances
Amateur
 Eisenhower Trophy (representing Colombia): 2010, 2012

References

External links

Colombian male golfers
PGA Tour Latinoamérica golfers
Golfers at the 2015 Pan American Games
Pan American Games medalists in golf
Pan American Games gold medalists for Colombia
Medalists at the 2015 Pan American Games
Central American and Caribbean Games gold medalists for Colombia
Central American and Caribbean Games medalists in golf
Competitors at the 2018 Central American and Caribbean Games
Sportspeople from Bogotá
1989 births
Living people
21st-century Colombian people